Samuel Clerk was an Anglican priest, who served as Archdeacon of Derby from 1617 until 1641.

Clerk was born in Warwickshire and educated at Magdalen College, Oxford.

References

Archdeacons of Derby
People from Warwickshire
Alumni of Magdalen College, Oxford